Bhaskar Bhattacharya (born 29 September 1952) is a former Chief Justice of Gujarat High Court.

Career
Bhattacharya passed B.Sc. and LL.B. from the Jogesh Chandra Chaudhuri Law College, University of Calcutta. He was enrolled as an Advocate on 14 March 1975 and started practice in civil matters in the Calcutta High Court. He became senior Advocate in 1994. Bhattacharya was appointed  a permanent Judge of the Calcutta High Court on 17 July 1997. He was transferred to Gujarat High Court and joined there on 8 November 2011 and became the Chief Justice on 18 July 2012. He retired on 28 September 2014 from the post.

References

1952 births
Living people
Indian judges
20th-century Indian judges
20th-century Indian lawyers
Chief Justices of the Gujarat High Court
Judges of the Calcutta High Court
Jogesh Chandra Chaudhuri Law College alumni
University of Calcutta alumni